Richard Lynn "Sandy" Alderson (born November 22, 1947) is an American baseball executive. He was most recently the president of the New York Mets. He previously served as the general manager of the New York Mets from 2011 to 2018, an executive in the Oakland Athletics and San Diego Padres organizations, and the commissioner's office of Major League Baseball. As a front office executive, Alderson led the Athletics to a World Series championship in 1989 and led the Athletics to the World Series in three straight seasons. Alderson led the Mets to the 2015 World Series.

Early life
Alderson is the son of Gwenny Parry Alderson and John Lester Alderson; the latter an Air Force pilot who flew missions during World War II, Korea, and Vietnam. Alderson has two siblings, Kristy and Dave.

Alderson attended Falls Church High School in Falls Church, Virginia and later Dartmouth College in New Hampshire on a NROTC scholarship. After graduating from Dartmouth in 1969, he joined the United States Marine Corps and served a tour of duty in Vietnam. He received his Juris Doctor from Harvard Law School in 1976. After law school, he worked for the Farella Braun & Martel law firm in San Francisco, California.

Career

Oakland Athletics
Roy Eisenhardt, one of the firm's partners, left to become president of the Oakland Athletics when his father-in-law, Walter A. Haas Jr., bought the team. In 1981, Alderson joined Eisenhardt to become the Athletics' general counsel and in 1983 was named the team's general manager, a position he held through 1997. Under Alderson, the Athletics' minor league system was rebuilt, which bore fruit later that decade as José Canseco (1986), Mark McGwire (1987), and Walt Weiss (1988) were chosen as American League Rookies of the Year. The Athletics won four division titles, three pennants and the 1989 World Series during Alderson's tenure.

In 1995, Haas died and the team's new owners, Stephen Schott and Ken Hofmann, ordered Alderson to slash payroll. As a result, Alderson began focusing on sabermetric principles toward obtaining relatively undervalued players. He was a mentor to his eventual successor as general manager, Billy Beane.

Commissioner's office
Alderson left the Athletics to work for Major League Baseball's commissioner’s office, where he was the Executive Vice President for Baseball Operations between September 1998 and 2005. 
In 2010, Alderson worked as commissioner Bud Selig’s point man to address the issues of the corruption of baseball in the Dominican Republic, the largest supplier of Major League Baseball talent outside the United States.

San Diego Padres
Alderson served as chief executive officer for the San Diego Padres from 2005 to 2009, with the team winning back-to-back division titles in 2005 and 2006. Concurrently, he lectured at the University of California, Berkeley Haas School of Business.

New York Mets
Alderson was hired by the New York Mets after the 2010 baseball season to replace Omar Minaya as the general manager. He was officially introduced on October 29, 2010, signing a four-year deal with a club option for 2015. Mets owner, Fred Wilpon, was dealing with his involvement in the Madoff investment scandal, and Alderson worked with a limited budget. As Alderson was Billy Beane's predecessor and mentor with the Oakland A's, and as the Mets also hired Beane's former associates Paul DePodesta  and J.P. Ricciardi to the front office, the team was jokingly referred to as the "Moneyball Mets".

The first big money signing that Alderson did with the Mets was a 7-year contract extension for David Wright in December 2012 which was worth $138 million (7 years for $122 million plus a club option for $16 million that the club picked up for the 2013 season). Wright's deal was contrary to the Mets budget-conscious policy of not offering large contracts to players aged in their 30s. Nonetheless, Alderson made an exception as he viewed Wright as a leader and role model, on and off the field. Although it had been six years since the Mets' last playoff appearance and four years since their last winning season, Alderson managed to persuade Wright to stay, as the Mets' farm system had many young, talented pitchers.

From 2012 to 2014, Alderson reduced the Mets payroll to under $100 million, and exchanged veterans to acquire young talent such as Zack Wheeler, Noah Syndergaard, and Travis d'Arnaud. Alderson also developed players drafted by Minaya such as Matt Harvey, Jacob deGrom, and Steven Matz. The Mets won the National League Pennant in 2015, earning their first World Series appearance since 2000.

Alderson took a leave of absence from the Mets in July 2018 due to a recurrence of cancer. He was informally succeeded on an interim basis by John Ricco, Omar Minaya, and J. P. Ricciardi. After the season he later decided not to return to the position. Since then, he has been cancer-free.

Return to the Athletics
In January 2019, Alderson returned to the Oakland Athletics as senior advisor of baseball operations to general manager Billy Beane. He left the position after the 2020 season in order to return to the Mets front office.

Return to the Mets
In September 2020, new Mets owner Steve Cohen hired Alderson as team president after he was approved as majority owner by MLB. He replaced Saul Katz, who had served in that capacity since 1980. In September 2022, it was announced he would step down as team president and move into a special advisory role. In February 2023, Alderson was officially no longer the president of the team.

Personal life
Alderson is married to Linda Alderson. They have two children, Bryn and Cate, who both also attended Dartmouth, and 5 grandchildren. Alderson lives in St. Petersburg, Florida.

References

External links

C-SPAN

1947 births
Living people
Businesspeople from Seattle
Major League Baseball general managers
Major League Baseball team presidents
Oakland Athletics executives
San Diego Padres executives
New York Mets executives
Major League Baseball Executive Vice Presidents for Baseball Operations
United States Marine Corps officers
United States Marine Corps personnel of the Vietnam War
Haas School of Business faculty
Dartmouth College alumni
Harvard Law School alumni